Backlash is the second and final studio album by British/American rock supergroup Bad English, released in 1991.

The album peaked at No. 72 on the Billboard 200.

Critical reception
Entertainment Weekly wrote that "taken together, the album — with its unceasing references to rain and rivers — inevitably bogs down, but heard one at a time over the FM in the Ford, even its platitudes, given [John] Waite’s delivery, add up to a hack-rock miracle or two." The Rolling Stone Album Guide deemed Backlash "more spirited" than the debut.

Track listing 
"So This Is Eden" (John Waite, Jonathan Cain, Russ Ballard) - 5:09
"Straight to Your Heart" (Waite, Neal Schon, Cain, Mark Spiro) - 4:09
"Time Stood Still" (Waite, Ricky Phillips, Jesse Harms) - 5:23
"The Time Alone with You" (Waite, Diane Warren, Cain) - 4:41
"Dancing Off the Edge of the World" (Waite, Cain, Schon) - 4:54
"Rebel Say a Prayer" (Waite, Cain, Ballard) - 4:23
"Savage Blue" (Waite, Cain, Schon) - 4:33
"Pray for Rain" (Waite, Spiro, Cain) - 5:03
"Make Love Last" (Waite, Cain) - 5:19
"Life at the Top" (Waite, Cain, Spiro, Tim Pierce) - 4:51

Singles
The following singles were released from the album, with the highest charting positions listed.

Personnel
Band members
John Waite - lead vocals, rhythm guitar
Neal Schon - lead guitar, background vocals
Ricky Phillips - bass, background vocals
Jonathan Cain - keyboards, background vocals
Deen Castronovo - drums, background vocals

Additional musicians
Mark Spiro, Tommy Funderburk - background vocals

Production
Ron Nevison - producer, engineer
Tony Phillips - vocal producer
Rand & Rose - mixing
Ted Jensen - mastering at Sterling Sound
Dale Lavi - art direction and design

References

1991 albums
Bad English albums
Albums produced by Ron Nevison
Epic Records albums